United Nations Security Council Resolution 292, adopted unanimously on February 10, 1971, after examining the application of  Bhutan for membership in the United Nations, the Council recommended to the General Assembly that Bhutan be admitted.

See also
 List of United Nations Security Council Resolutions 201 to 300 (1965–1971)

References
Text of the Resolution at undocs.org

External links
 

 0292
1971 in Bhutan
Foreign relations of Bhutan
 0292
 0292
February 1971 events